The mission of the nonprofit, nonpartisan World Affairs Council of Dallas/Fort Worth is to promote international awareness, understanding and connections through its multifaceted programs.  The Council works to enhance the region's global stature and to prepare North Texans to thrive in this complex world.

The council presents over 100 programs annually, primarily focusing on the international aspects of business, politics, culture and foreign policy.  With the goal of connecting North Texas with the world, the Council has been educating Metroplex citizens on global affairs since 1951.  Today, it serves as a gateway to the world for the region, offering an impressive range of programs and events for the public and its more than 3,000 members.

The Council takes education directly into North Texas schools through its Global Young Leaders program.  Additionally, it coordinates visits to North Texas of delegations and leaders from around the world through the International Visitor Program and Dallas Protocol.

WorldQuest
The World Affairs Council of Dallas/Fort Worth sponsors the PwC Academic World Quest competition each year, testing high schoolers' knowledge of world affairs, geography, history, culture, flags, sports, current events, leaders, economics, international organizations, and more. The winning team, made up of four students, receives an expenses-paid trip to the national tournament in Washington, D.C.

Notable speakers

Some famous and important speakers the World Affairs Council has presented include:

 Bono, lead singer of U2 and co-founder of DATA
 Paul Bremer, former Director of Reconstruction and Humanitarian Assistance of post-war Iraq
 Dick Cheney, Vice President of the United States
 Clark Ervin, former Inspector General of the Department of Homeland Security
 Ari Fleischer, former White House Press Secretary
 Thomas Friedman, The New York Times columnist and Pulitzer Prize recipient
 Alan Greenspan, former Chairman of the Federal Reserve
 Kay Bailey Hutchison, United States Senator, Texas
 Carlos Alberto de Icaza Gonzalez, Mexican Ambassador to the United States
 Gen. Ronald Keys, Commander of Air Combat Command of the United States Air Force
 David McCullough, author, historian, and Pulitzer Prize recipient
 T. Boone Pickens, founder of BP Capital
 Condoleezza Rice, United States Secretary of State
 Jack Welch, former CEO of General Electric
 Carlos Westendorp, Spanish Ambassador to the United States
 Prince Turki al-Faisal, Saudi Ambassador to the United States
 Zhou Wenzhong, Chinese Ambassador to the United States

References

External links
 World Affairs Council of Dallas/Fort Worth
 World Affairs Councils of America

Non-profit organizations based in Texas
World Affairs Councils